Ahmed Rahmatullah (Arabic:أحمد رحمة الله) (born 22 July 1986) is a Qatari footballer .

External links
 

Qatari footballers
1986 births
Living people
Al Ahli SC (Doha) players
Al-Wakrah SC players
Umm Salal SC players
Qatar Stars League players
Qatari Second Division players
Place of birth missing (living people)
Association football defenders